Gergő Oláh (born 18 February 1989) is a Hungarian football defender. He made his professional debut in the 2012–13 Nemzeti Bajnokság I against Kaposvári Rákóczi FC. He has two children, Zalán and Anna.

References

1989 births
Living people
People from Gyula
Hungarian footballers
Association football defenders
Debreceni VSC players
Létavértes SC players
Békéscsaba 1912 Előre footballers
Balmazújvárosi FC players
FC Tatabánya players
Szeged-Csanád Grosics Akadémia footballers
Kisvárda FC players
Nemzeti Bajnokság I players
Nemzeti Bajnokság II players
Nemzeti Bajnokság III players
Sportspeople from Békés County
21st-century Hungarian people